Muhammad Shafiq Bin Jamal (born 12 December 1987, in Jitra, Kedah) is a Malaysian Footballer.

Biography 
Shafiq was recruited from Bukit Jalil Sports School. He was in the Kedah Malaysia President Cup squad and was SUKMA 2006 silver medalist with Kedah. He was promoted to the senior team for season 2006/07. He also a former member of the Malaysia U-20 squad from 2004 until 2006.

From the 2011 season he joined Perak FA due to limited opportunities he had during his time with Kedah FA. He played with Perak for two seasons, before being released at the end of the 2012 season. He joined Sime Darby FC, along with four other former Perak players, for the 2013 season.

After playing with Sime Darby for 3 years, he joined PDRM FA for the 2016 season. However, after testing positive for banned substance during a Super League match with Perak, Shafiq was banned from football-related matters for two years, together with Firdaus Saiyadi from Perak for the same offence.

References

External links 
 

1987 births
Living people
Malaysian people of Malay descent
Malaysian footballers
Kedah Darul Aman F.C. players
Perak F.C. players
People from Kedah
Doping cases in association football
Association football forwards